Phyllonorycter fiumella is a moth of the family Gracillariidae. It is known from Croatia, France, Italy and North Macedonia.

The larvae feed on Acer monspessulanum.

References

fiumella
Moths of Europe